Potassium hexachloroplatinate is the inorganic compound with the formula K2PtCl6. It is a yellow solid that is an example of a comparatively insoluble potassium salt. The salt features the hexachloroplatinate(IV) dianion, which has octahedral coordination geometry.

The precipitation of this compound from solutions of hexachloroplatinic acid was formerly used for the determination of potassium by gravimetric analysis. It is also useful as an intermediate in the recovery of platinum from wastes.

Reactions
Using salt metathesis reactions, potassium hexachloroplatinate is converted to a variety of quaternary ammonium and related lipophilic salts. These include tetrabutylammonium salt (NBu4)2PtCl6, which has been investigated as a catalyst.

Reduction of potassium hexachloroplatinate with hydrazine dihydrochloride gives the corresponding tetrachloroplatinate salt.

Safety
Dust containing potassium hexachloroplatinate can be highly allergenic. "Symptoms range from irritation of skin and mucous membranes to life-threatening attacks of asthma."

Related compounds
Ammonium hexachloroplatinate

References

Potassium compounds
Hexachloroplatinates